Yasmina Azzizi-Kettab (born 25 February 1966) is a retired Algerian heptathlete.

International competitions

Personal bests
100 metres – 11.69 (1991)
200 metres – 23.38 (1992)
800 metres – 2:17.17 (1991)
100 metres hurdles – 13.02 (1992)
High jump – 1.79 (1991)
Long jump – 6.15 (1991)
Shot put – 16.16 (1995)
Javelin throw – 46.28 (2000)
Heptathlon – 6392 (1991)

External links

1966 births
Living people
Algerian heptathletes
Olympic athletes of Algeria
Athletes (track and field) at the 1988 Summer Olympics
Athletes (track and field) at the 2000 Summer Olympics
African Games gold medalists for Algeria
African Games medalists in athletics (track and field)
Mediterranean Games gold medalists for Algeria
Mediterranean Games medalists in athletics
Athletes (track and field) at the 1987 All-Africa Games
Athletes (track and field) at the 1991 Mediterranean Games
21st-century Algerian people